Qaiser Hussain (born 28 November 1959) is a Pakistani former cricketer. He played thirty first-class and ten List A matches for several domestic teams in Pakistan between 1980 and 1986.

See also
 List of Pakistan Automobiles Corporation cricketers

References

External links
 

1959 births
Living people
Pakistani cricketers
Industrial Development Bank of Pakistan cricketers
Pakistan Automobiles Corporation cricketers
Cricketers from Karachi